(David) Colin Dunlop (31 July 1897 – 23 February 1968) was an Anglican bishop in the 20th century.

Educated at Radley and New College, Oxford, he was ordained after wartime service. He enlisted in 1915 as ‘Medically A1’ and served with the 3rd Buffs in France. He was a lieutenant when he relinquished command to attend New College. His first post was as a curate at St Mary, Primrose Hill, after which he became Chaplain to George Bell, Bishop of Chichester, and Chaplain at St Peter and St Sigfrid's Church in Stockholm. Appointed Vicar of St Thomas Hove and  then Henfield, in 1940 he became Provost of St Mary's Cathedral, Edinburgh before  elevation to the episcopate as Bishop of Jarrow (and Archdeacon of Auckland) five years later. In 1949 he became Dean of Lincoln, a post he held until he retired in November 1964. Early in 1950, he was also appointed an Assistant Bishop of Lincoln; which post he retained til his 1964 retirement from the Deanery.

In 1955 he was appointed the first chair of the Liturgical Commission of the Church of England.
There is a description of him during his time in Jarrow ‘In appearance, he was a striking character, good looking and unusual in the gift of preaching a sermon in the grand manner of a former age’.

References

1897 births
People educated at Radley College
Alumni of New College, Oxford
Provosts of St Mary's Cathedral, Edinburgh (Episcopal)
Bishops of Jarrow
Archdeacons of Auckland
Deans of Lincoln
20th-century Church of England bishops
1968 deaths
Buffs (Royal East Kent Regiment) officers
British Army personnel of World War I